Shashwat Kohli (born 2 May 1997) is an Indian cricketer. He made his List A debut on 24 September 2019, for Arunachal Pradesh in the 2019–20 Vijay Hazare Trophy. He made his Twenty20 debut on 8 November 2019, for Arunachal Pradesh in the 2019–20 Syed Mushtaq Ali Trophy. He made his first-class debut on 11 January 2020, for Arunachal Pradesh in the 2019–20 Ranji Trophy.

References

External links
 

1997 births
Living people
Indian cricketers
Arunachal Pradesh cricketers
Place of birth missing (living people)
21st-century Indian people